Crypt of the Sorcerer is a miniatures game published by Heritage Models.

Gameplay
Crypt of the Sorcerer is a game kit for miniatures fantasy gaming, including four adventurers and four monsters cast in lead, paints and painting tips, and an adventure scenario.

Reception
Jay Rudin reviewed Crypt of the Sorcerer in The Space Gamer No. 30. Rudin commented that "It comes down to eight miniatures and two hours' worth of gaming—total. There's nothing criminal about it except you can get much better for less money. It might be helpful for beginners, but if you're enough of a gamer to be reading The Space Gamer, you don't need it."

References

Miniatures games